Brian Udaigwe is a Biafran-Nigeria prelate of the Catholic Church who was appointed as the Apostolic Nuncio to Sri Lanka in 2020.

Biography 
Brian Udaigwe was born in Tiko in southwest Cameroon on 19 July 1964. He was ordained a priest of the Diocese of Orlu, Nigeria, on 2 May 1992. He attended the Pontifical Ecclesiastical Academy entered the diplomatic service of the Holy See on 1 July 1994, and served in Zimbabwe, the Ivory Coast, Haiti, Bulgaria, Thailand, and, beginning in January 2008, in the United Kingdom.

On 22 February 2013, Pope Benedict XVI named him an apostolic nuncio and titular archbishop of Suelli.

On 8 April 2013, Pope Francis appointed him apostolic nuncio to Benin. He received his episcopal consecration on 27 April from Cardinal Tarcisio Bertone, SDB, Secretary of State. He presented his credentials in Benin on 24 June. On 16 July 2013, he was named Nuncio to Togo as well. He presented his credentials there on 26 September.

On 13 June 2020, he was named Apostolic Nuncio to Sri Lanka.

See also
 List of heads of the diplomatic missions of the Holy See

References

External links
 Catholic Hierarchy: Archbishop Brian Udaigwe 

1964 births
Living people
Apostolic Nuncios to Benin
Apostolic Nuncios to Togo
Apostolic Nuncios to Sri Lanka
Pontifical Ecclesiastical Academy alumni